Marmarashen, known until 1967 as Aghamzalu, is a village in the Masis Municipality of the Ararat Province of Armenia.

References 

World Gazeteer: Armenia – World-Gazetteer.com

Populated places in Ararat Province